Francisco Amado Córdova Ramírez (1916 – 1990) was a Mexican character actor who has appeared in numerous films of United States and Mexico.

Personal life
He is the grandfather of actress Natalia Cordova-Buckley.

Selected filmography

American films
Butch Cassidy and the Sundance Kid (1969) - Bank Manager
Two Mules for Sister Sara (1970) - Juan's father
The Wrath of God (1972) - Tacho
The Long Goodbye (1973) - Doctor
The Mansion of Madness (1973) - Pseudo-Marshal
Once Upon a Scoundrel (1974)

Mexican films

Los huéspedes de La Marquesa (1951)
Los tres alegres compadres (1952) - (uncredited)
Sí, mi vida (1953) - Locutor (uncredited)
Fugitivos: Pueblo de proscritos (1955) - Juvencio
El 7 leguas (1955) - Clavo (uncredited)
Camino de Guanajuato (1955) - Director pelicula (uncredited)
Caras nuevas (1956)
Ay, Chaparros... ¡Cómo abundan! (1956)
La locura del rock 'n roll (1957) - don Rubén
Nunca me hagan eso (1957) - Director de pelicula
La esquina de mi barrio (1957)
Vuelve Chistelandia (1958)
Nueva Chistelandia (1958)
Chistelandia (1958)
Échenme al gato (1958) - Doctor Pastrana
Pepito y los robachicos (1958) - Entrenador
Manos arriba (1958) - Don Alfredo
The Boxer (1958) - Amigo borracho de don Chon
Ama a tu prójimo (1958) - Chofer cruz roja (uncredited)
Sabrás que te quiero (1958) - Pancho
Una abuelita atómica (1958) - Sr. Ruanova
Vivir del cuento (1959) - Coronel Gumaro Escamilla
El cofre del pirata (1959)
El cariñoso (1959) - Amigo de Raúl
Mi niño, mi caballo y yo (1959)
Las coronelas (1959) - Corneta
Nacida para amar (1959)
La pandilla se divierte (1959)
La pandilla en acción (1959) - Director pelicula (uncredited)
Rebel Without a House (1960, adaptation)
Tin Tan y las modelos (1960) - Don Pioquinto de la Garza
Dos criados malcriados (1960) - El Buffalo
Con quien andan nuestros locos (1961)
Suerte te dé Dios (1961) - Don Chon
Tres tristes tigres (1961) - Don Chon, comisario
Mañana serán hombres (1961) - Miembro equipo rodaje
Muchachas que trabajan (1961) - Don Joaquín, papá de Cora
Aventuras del látigo negro (1961)
Besito a Papa (1961) - Merolico
Los hermanos Del Hierro (1961) - Hombre que contrata la muerte de Zeñn
Carnaval en mi barrio (1961) - Coreógrafo
Con la misma moneda (1961) - Don Miguel, comisario
Juan sin miedo (1961) - Sabino
Juventud sin Dios (La vida del padre Lambert) (1962) - Padre de Raymundo
La marca del gavilán (1962) - Don Miguel, comisario
El malvado Carabel (1962) - Francisco Olalla
The Exterminating Angel (1962) - (uncredited)
The Bloody Vampire (1962) - Justus
El látigo negro contra los farsantes (1962) - Don Miguel
La muerte pasa lista (1962) - Don Miguel, comisario
Tlayucan (1962) - Rito, sacristán
El tesoro del rey Salomón (1963) - Dios tigre
Vuelven los Argumedo (1963) - (uncredited)
La risa de la ciudad (1963) - Colocho
Aventuras de las hermanas X (1963) - Vladimir
Las vengadoras enmascaradas (1963)
En la vieja California (1963) - Pancho
Tin-Tan el hombre mono (1963) - Padre de Helen
Los bravos de California (1963)
Las hijas del Zorro (1964)
La sonrisa de los pobres (1964)
El mundo de las drogas (1964) - El rata
En la mitad del mundo (1964)
Historia de un canalla (1964) - Gerente
Las invencibles (1964)
Un gallo con espolones (Operación ñongos) (1964) - Jefe de Cachirulo y Copet (uncredited)
Un ángel de mal genio (1964)
Los hijos del condenado (1964)
Tarahumara (Cada vez más lejos) (1965) - Don Celedonio
El gángster (1965) - Ricky Rito
Los dos cuatreros (1965)
Los Sánchez deben morir (1966) - Comisario
Tirando a gol (1966) - Médico
¿Qué haremos con papá? (1966)
Esta noche no (1966) - don Agustin
La soldadera (1966) - Padre de Lázara (uncredited)
Rage (1966) - Old Man
Guns for San Sebastian (1968) - Kino
Agente 00 Sexy (1968) - Col. Gomez
Los asesinos (1968) - Tom Foster
Autopsia de un fantasma (1968) - Pinedo
Lío de faldas (1969) - Médico (uncredited)
Al rojo vivo (1969) - Borracho en burdel
Cuando los hijos se van (1969) - Javier Ramírez
La marcha de Zacatecas (1969) - Notario
La puerta y la mujer del carnicero (1969) - Invitado (segment "La puerta")
Romance sobre ruedas (1969)
Tres amigos (1970) - Licenciado
La guerra de las monjas (1970) - Raptor
El oficio mas antiguo del mundo (1970) - Doctor
La vida inútil de Pito Pérez (1970)
Paraíso (1970) - Caguamo
Siempre hay una primera vez (1971) - Javier's father (segment "Rosa")
Jesús, nuestro Señor (1971) - Doctor
El médico módico (1971) - Director del hospital
Sin salida (1971) - Don Ceve
El águila descalza (1971) - Encargado de Manicomio
Los destrampados (1971)
Tú, yo, nosotros (1972) - Padre de Julián
Sucedió en Jalisco (1972) - Don Jesús
Cayó de la gloria el diablo (1972) - Ingeniero
Doña Macabra (1972) - Octavio
Hay ángeles sin alas (1972) - Paul
Los hijos de Satanás (1972)
El vals sin fin (1972) - Bibliotecario
El rincón de las vírgenes (1972) - Melesio Terrones
Un pirata de doce años (1972)
National Mechanics (1972) - El güero Corrales
Apolinar (1972)
Los cachorros (1973)
Those Years (1973) - Sr. Jecker
El bueno para nada (1973) - Benigno Saldaña
Presagio (1974) - Padre Ángel
Fe, esperanza y caridad (1974) - Jacobo (segment "Caridad")
Calzonzin Inspector (1974) - Don Perpetuo del Rosal
En busca de un muro (1974) - Fernando Galván
La madrecita (1974) - Comisario
Cristo te ama (1975)
Tívoli (1975) - Quijanito
Don Herculano enamorado (1975) - Don Herculano Zúñiga y Ponce de León
La presidenta municipal (1975) - Mr. Peppermint
Bellas de noche (1975)
El alegre divorciado (1976) - Don Felipe Aguirre
El rey (1976) - Governador Patrocinio del Rivero
El niño y la estrella (1976)
La vida cambia (1976) - Don Bernardo
Pantaleón y las visitadoras (1976) - El Sinchi
Length of War (1976) - Gral. Felipe Cruz
Acto de posesión (1977) - Pedro
Las ficheras: Bellas de noche II parte (1977) - Psicologo
La coquito (1977)
Una noche embarazosa (1977) - Doctor Perales
Duro pero seguro (1978) - Doctor Luis Frey
La plaza de Puerto Santo (1978) - Don Gonzalo
El jardín de los cerezos (1978) - Don Placido
Las noches de Paloma (1978) - Don Ángel Monroy
Rocky Carambola (1979) - Don Damián
Matar por matar (1979)
El rediezcubrimiento de México (1979) - Don Melitón Samaniego Teocaltiche
La capilla ardiente (1981)
La muerte es un buen negocio (1981) - (final film role)

References

External links

1916 births
1990 deaths
20th-century Mexican male actors
Best Actor Ariel Award winners
Mexican expatriates in the United States
Politicians from Chiapas
People from Pichucalco